Ice hockey at the 2020 Winter Youth Olympics took place at the Vaudoise Aréna in Lausanne, Switzerland from 10 to 22 January 2020.

A total of four events were contested: a men's and women's tournament (six teams per gender), alongside a mixed 3x3 tournament for each gender. The 3x3 competition replaced the skills challenge that was held in the first two editions. A country could enter a maximum of 26 athletes (17 for the team tournament, plus 4 in the boys' 3x3 tournament and 5 in the girl's 3x3 tournament). Hosts Switzerland were permitted to enter in each event, meaning the NOC could enter 43 athletes.

Medal summary

Medal table

Medalists

Qualification

Summary

Team tournament
The top ten NOC's ranked in the combined ranking from the 2018 and 2019 editions of the IIHF World U18 Championships and IIHF World Women's U18 Championships will be allowed to enter a boys' or girls' team, with the top ranked country choosing first and so on. Each country can only enter one team, with the exception being hosts, Switzerland, which can enter a team in both tournaments. Each team will consist of 17 players.

Ranking

3x3
The top 15 countries in each respective (and hosts Switzerland), will be allowed to enter one goaltender each. Each team will consist of 13 players (2 goaltenders and 11 players). Each nation can enter a maximum of three players for the boys' competition and four for the girls'. The host nation Switzerland has been allocated the maximum quota. Each NOC (that organizes a skills challenge competition) will be allocated one quota spot. All other spots will be awarded using a ranking list of all athletes that contested the skills competition across all countries, respecting the maximum quota per NOC.

Men
The final quotas were released on November 1, 2019.

Women
The final quotas were released on November 1, 2019.

References

External links
Results Book – Ice Hockey

 
2020
Youth Olympics
2020 Winter Youth Olympics events
2020